Life in the Finnish Woods (Swedish: Livet i Finnskogarna) is a 1947 Swedish drama film directed by Ivar Johansson and starring Carl Jularbo, Naima Wifstrand and Barbro Ribbing. It was shot at the Centrumateljéerna Studios in Stockholm with location shooting around Bollnäs in Eastern Sweden. The film's sets were designed by the art director P.A. Lundgren. It takes its title from a 1913 waltz of the same title by Jularbo, whose signature tune it became.

Synopsis
It is set in 1906 when Forest Finns settlers who set up their home in the plains of Sweden over the previous centuries still face the hostility from local Swedes.

Cast
 Carl Jularbo as 	Self 
 Naima Wifstrand as 	Mrs. Sigrid Malm
 Barbro Ribbing as 	Ingeborg Malm
 Bengt Logardt as 	Gunnar Malm
 Kenne Fant as 	Heikki Purje 
 Mirjami Kuosmanen as 	Aino
 Sigbrit Molin as Ellen Bjurselius 
 John Elfström as 	Simon Bäcklin
 Eric Laurent as Johan Lång
 Henning Ohlsson as Kolar-Jocke
 Torgny Anderberg as 	August
 Eivor Landström as 	Margit
 Nine-Christine Jönsson as Inger
 Carl Reinholdz as 	Mattias på Lagsta
 Nils Hultgren as 	Jon-Erik i Bråten
 Siegfried Fischer as 	Nils i Fallet 
 Torsten Bergström as 	County constable

References

Bibliography 
 Qvist, Per Olov & von Bagh, Peter. Guide to the Cinema of Sweden and Finland. Greenwood Publishing Group, 2000.

External links 
 

1947 films
Swedish drama films
1947 drama films
1940s Swedish-language films
Films directed by Ivar Johansson
Swedish black-and-white films
Films set in the 1900s
Films set in Sweden
1940s Swedish films